Zulte is a Belgian municipality located in Flanders and in the Flemish province of East Flanders. The municipality comprises the towns of Machelen,  and Zulte proper. In 2021, Zulte had a total population of 15,843. The total area is 32.52 km2.

The town used to have its own beer since 1891 (simply called Zulte) but today they are part of Alken-Maes breweries.  The main football club from Zulte merged with KSV Waregem to form a team called SV Zulte Waregem that plays in the Belgian Pro League as of 2006.

Famous inhabitants
Roger Raveel, painter
Gerard Reve, Dutch writer

References

External links

 Official website

Municipalities of East Flanders
Populated places in East Flanders
Zulte